le Grange is a South African surname that may refer to
Ferdie le Grange (1948–2013), South African plastic surgeon and marathon runner
Louis le Grange (1928–1991), South African politician
Pieter le Grange (born 1916), South African Air Force officer 
Sandra le Grange (born 1993), South African badminton player

See also
Lagrange (surname)